Let The Circle Be Unbroken is the 1981 sequel to Roll of Thunder, Hear My Cry (1976), written by Mildred D. Taylor. T.J.'s punishment is approaching, Stacey runs away to find work, and the Logan children's cousin, Suzella Rankin, tries to pass herself off as a white person, but fails which leads to embarrassing consequences.  It won the Coretta Scott King Author Award in 1982.

Plot summary
The Logan family goes through hard times trying to raise their children the correct way. T.J. Avery, Stacey's friend, is accused of murdering a white man, Jim Lee Barnett. Although he is innocent, he is tried by an all-white jury and convicted. Stacey does everything in his power to help his friend, but in the end, T.J. is sentenced to death.

A man makes a file to join blacks and whites together so the cotton fields can be shared. The union does not succeed and the man who wanted to start it is beaten. Some people are told that they need to pull up the acres that were already planted because they planted too much. The plantation owners lied, claiming the government ordered it, but the plantation owners did it in order to receive money that was supposed to go to the sharecroppers.

Mama's cousin Bud's daughter Suzella, who has a black father and a white mother, lives with the Logans. Suzella is venerated for being attractive and mixed, making her seem like a prize to all the males in the town because she is technically black and therefore accessible, but still has the lighter skin, hair, and eyes; she can be assumed as white. Suzella struggles with identity issues that put a strain on her relationships with others. She catches the eye of Stuart Walker, a white boy who flirts with pretty colored girls to start trouble. When Stuart approaches her he genuinely respects her, assuming she is white. This takes a great toll on Stacey; he believes he must take care of his family before they lose their land. He and his best friend Moe run away to a sugarcane field to work. With the help of Mr. Jamison, a white lawyer who is kind and fair to black people, Mama, Papa and Caroline Logan (Big Ma) contact police stations in the next couple of towns. They address the letters in Mr. Jamison's name so that when the sheriffs receive the letters they will respond. Mr. Jamison says that if they see a black family name on the letters they probably will not respond.  Seven months later, they find Stacey several hours away, jailed in a small town in Louisiana. Stacey and Moe were accused of stealing which put them in jail, where they became ill. While Stacey was at the cane field a pole rolled over his foot and broke it. Before they drive home, they stop by the house of a lady who took care of Stacey and Moe while they were in jail and thank her. They stay the night there and the next morning return home.

Characters

The Logan Family
Cassie Logan: A strong-willed girl willing to fight for anything she believes in. The story takes place from her point of view. She is mainly a tomboy who learns valuable life lessons from her father, grandmother, and Stacey. Cassie is ten and in fifth grade.
Stacey Logan: He is a 13-year-old boy and gives plenty of advice. He is also portrayed as strong-minded and loving towards his family. The reason why he leaves home is that he is trying to get a job at the cane fields in Louisiana to earn extra money for the family. He is the son of Mary and David Logan (Mama and Papa). Stacey also feels that it is his responsibility to take care of the family; he has grown up and has become more emotional and territorial towards his family, which is why he goes for the job in Louisiana.
Christopher-John Logan: Stacey and Cassie's second younger brother. Christopher-John is notorious for being a rule follower and doesn't like going against the family's decisions and getting himself in trouble.
Little Man Logan (Clayton Chester): Stacey and Cassie's youngest brother. He is very neat and tidy and does not like to be discriminated against even though he does not understand what that is at his young age.
David Logan: The father of the Logan children, known as Papa. He worked on the railroad and tries to teach his children life lessons in hopes of keeping them get out of trouble.
Mary Logan: The mother in the Logan family. She used to be a school teacher, but now she organizes groups to change society. Mary is Cousin Bud's aunt, but Cousin Bud is more like her brother since Bud is three years older than she is, and they grew up together.
Caroline "Big Ma" Logan: She is the mother of David and Hammer Logan and the grandmother of the Logan children. She is portrayed as a strong and good-natured woman. Caroline Logan has influenced Cassie Logan growing up by passing on the family stories and history to her. She helps many people who are sick and those who have been treated badly by white people. She is very religious and has passed her views to Cassie. Caroline Logan is otherwise known as Big Ma. She is the mother-in-law of Mary Logan, mother of David, and Hammer Logan. Last but not least, she is the grandmother of Stacey, Cassie, Christopher-John, and of course, Little Man.
Uncle Hammer: David Logan's older brother and Cassie's uncle. He moved to Chicago before the Logan saga because of the racism in Mississippi. He is portrayed as having a hair-trigger temper, which is something a black man "isn't allowed to have" in the Depression-era South. He provided financial assistance to the rest of the family several times (which they secretly appreciate).

Other characters
Suzella Rankin: Cousin of the Logan family children. She's an attractive light-skinned girl who initially accepts the advances of white young men, but is later found to be black, with embarrassing consequences.
T.J. Avery: A friend of the Logan children. He gets put on trial for a murder committed by the Simms brothers but is still convicted for the murder, even though Mr. Jamison gave solid evidence that R.W. and Melvin Simms committed the murder. He gets sentenced to death. He is responsible for making Mama lose her job in the previous book Roll of Thunder, Hear My Cry, and is beaten up by R.W. and Melvin Simms after the murder, breaking his ribs and jaw. Described as a manipulative, foolish teenager, and somehow became Stacey's friend. (Roll of Thunder Hear my Cry. Ch.1)
Jeremy Simms: A white teenager who is friends with the Logan children. He likes the Logan children and he doesn't abuse black people, unlike the rest of his family.
Mr. Wade Jamison: A white lawyer that supports the Logans and other black families in their town. He tried to defend T.J. at his trial.
Cousin Bud: The father of Suzella and married to a white woman. He is also Mary's (Mama's) nephew.
Lottie: She is the sister of Mary Logan.
Lee Annie: An elderly black woman that had an urge to learn about the history of the U.S. and go and register to vote. Ms. Lee Annie is like family to the Logans.
Mr. Morrison: A member of the Logan family after he was fired from his job. His family died when he was young.
Dubé Cross: The oldest child in his family, also the man of the family because his father is gone.
Moe Turner: A sharecropper and has his cotton plowed. He also ran away with Stacy to go work at the sugarcane fields.
Harlan Granger: A white land owner that likes to take all the land and money away from the black people, most of them are sharecroppers. He owns a lot of the land in their town, e.g. Granger Plantation.
Melvin Simms: Jeremy and R.W.’s brother and also was in the plan of using T.J.
The Barnetts: A couple that owns a store in Strawberry that people shop at. Jim Lee, the husband, is killed in a robbery by the Simms brothers. Mrs. Barnett accuses T.J. of the murder because he was the only unmasked character in the crime.
Mr. Farnsworth: A government agent that tells the Turners that he must plow up his cotton.
Jake Willis: A black man who does not ingratiate himself with the townspeople due to his sneering, meddlesome attitude. He picks fights with Uncle Hammer and tries to court Suzella. He is an inveterate gambler and prone to violence. At the end of the novel he loses an eye in the demonstration and blames Russell.
Sheriff Dobbs: The sheriff of a town in Louisiana. He helps the Logans locate Stacey when he runs away.
The Shorters: Sharecroppers that also must plow cotton.
The Laniers: Sharecroppers that also must plow cotton.
The Averys: T.J.'s family including his father, Joe, his mother, his younger brother Claude, and his two sisters. Friends with the Logan's.
Russell: Lee Annie's grandson. A handsome dark-skinned man who is in the army and very fond of Hammer Logan. Later in the story he takes a liking to Suzella.
Wordell: Lee Annie's grandson. An odd boy who does not talk much but, when he does it is usually something helpful and/or important

References

1981 American novels
Novels by Mildred D. Taylor
Sequel novels
Novels set in Mississippi
1981 children's books
Coretta Scott King Award-winning works